Richard Ellis represented Dedham, Massachusetts in the Great and General Court.

Ellis, along with Timothy Dwight, served as the agent of the Town when negotiating with King Phillip for title to the land today known as Wrentham, Massachusetts in 1660. At the time he was a sergeant in the militia. He served as a selectman for nine terms, beginning in 1673. In 1661 he was elected as Town Clerk, but he refused to serve.

References

Works cited

Members of the colonial Massachusetts General Court from Dedham
Year of birth missing
Year of death missing
Dedham, Massachusetts selectmen
Dedham Town Clerks
Signers of the Dedham Covenant
Military personnel from Dedham, Massachusetts